Arene lychee is a species of sea snail, a marine gastropod mollusk in the family Areneidae. It was described from Canopus Bank, a seamount located in northeastern Brazil, and named after its resemblance to the fruit of the Asian soapberry tree, Litchi chinenis.

Description
The shell can grow to be 7 mm to 9 mm in length, with a maximum diameter of 7-8 mm.

Distribution
Arene lychee has only been recorded in its type locality, Canopus Bank, a seamount off Ceará, in Northeast Brazil. It was found on coralline bottoms at depths of 200-260 m.

References

Areneidae
Gastropods described in 2018